Abu Aisha may refer to:
 Abu Aisha was believed to be an alternate name used by Fazul Abdullah Mohammed, suspected of a role in bombing US embassies in Africa
 Abu Aisha was believed to be an alternate name used by Abdel Malik Ahmed Abdel Wahab Al Rahabi, an individual held without charge for over 9 years by the USA